Nowshiravan (also Romanized as Nowshīravān; also known as Anūshīrvān, Tappeh-ye Nowshīravān, and Tepe Naushīrvān) is a village in Dasht-e Zahab Rural District, in the Central District of Sarpol-e Zahab County, Kermanshah Province, Iran. At the 2006 census, its population was 194, in 36 families.

References 

Populated places in Sarpol-e Zahab County